Yamané is a town in the Pâ Department of Balé Province in south-western Burkina Faso. The town has a population of 1820.

References

Populated places in the Boucle du Mouhoun Region
Balé Province